Vikas Bahl is an Indian filmmaker, best known for directing and scripting the comedy drama film Queen (2013).

Early life and education
Bahl was born and brought up in Lajpat Nagar in Delhi, and his father worked with the Indian Oil Corporation. After his schooling from Sardar Patel Vidyalaya and graduation from Ramjas College, Delhi, he moved to Mumbai to pursue an MBA degree from SVKM's NMIMS.

Career
Bahl started his career with advertising, working for several years in client servicing, before joining UTV Spotboy. In 2011, he started Phantom Films, along with Anurag Kashyap, Vikramaditya Motwane and Madhu Mantena. Over the years as a director he has worked with film directors such as Vishal Bhardwaj, Anurag Kashyap, Rajkumar Gupta and Vikramaditya Motwane.

In 2011, Bahl made his directorial debut under UTV Spotboy alongside co-director Nitesh Tiwari with Chillar Party and won the National Film Award for Best Screenplay, with Vijay Maurya. The film also garnered the National Film Award for Best Children's Film. In 2014 came his independent directorial venture Queen, starring Kangana Ranaut, which received critical and popular acclaim.

Bahl's 2015 film Shaandar, a destination wedding film, was a flop and received neutral to negative responses. In October 2014, he directed a short film Going Home, featuring Alia Bhatt, on women's safety, which went viral on social media. Bahl next directed a biopic on mathematician and IIT-JEE coach Anand Kumar called Super 30, which featured Hrithik Roshan as Kumar.

Bahl is now reported to helm the first instalment of Tiger Shroff's recently announced action franchise, titled Ganapath - Part 1, which is scheduled to release in January 2022 and will be produced by Jackky Bhagnani under Pooja Entertainment, as well as Bahl's new production house, Good Co.

Sexual harassment allegations  

In October 2018, in an interview with Huffington Post India, a former employee of Phantom Films accused Bahl of sexually harassing her on the set of the 2014 film Queen. Later, the film's lead actress Kangana Ranaut, in support of the former employee, also accused Bahl  of sexual misconduct. Following this, Nayani Dixit, Ranaut's co-star in the movie, levelled similar accusations against Bahl. As a result, Phantom Films announced its dissolution on 5 October 2018, largely in response to the sexual assault allegation against Bahl by another former Phantom employee, which was reported in 2015.  The other three founders, Kashyap, Motwane, and Mantena, all issued statements on Twitter confirming the company's disbanding and moving on to independent projects. After, Phantom Films subsequently disbanded, and founders Anurag Kashyap and Vikramaditya Motwane made formal statements against Bahl and his sexual misdemeanors. Bahl, in turn, sent them legal notices, citing defamation of character.

Filmography

Films

Television

Awards and nominations

References

External links
 
 

1971 births
Living people
Film producers from Delhi
Hindi-language film directors
Indian male screenwriters
Hindi film producers
Film directors from Delhi
Best Original Screenplay National Film Award winners
Directors who won the Best Children's Film National Film Award
Screen Awards winners
Ramjas College alumni